Olfactory receptor 2W1 is a protein that in humans is encoded by the OR2W1 gene.

Olfactory receptors interact with odorant molecules in the nose, to initiate a neuronal response that triggers the perception of a smell. The olfactory receptor proteins are members of a large family of G-protein-coupled receptors (GPCR) arising from single coding-exon genes. Olfactory receptors share a 7-transmembrane domain structure with many neurotransmitter and hormone receptors and are responsible for the recognition and G protein-mediated transduction of odorant signals. The olfactory receptor gene family is the largest in the genome. The nomenclature assigned to the olfactory receptor genes and proteins for this organism is independent of other organisms.

Ligands 
Out of 10 human ORs studied, OR2W1 was the most broadly tuned, meaning it responds to the greatest variety of different odorant molecules.

Ligands, in decreasing order of sensitivity:
 2-Heptanone
 1-Octanal
 (-)-Citronellol
 Hexanal
 3-Octanone
 Hexyl acetate
 1-Hexanol
 Octanoic acid
 1-Heptanol
 Allyl phenylacetate
 Benzyl acetate
 3,4-Hexanedione

See also 
 Olfactory receptor

References

Further reading

External links 
 

 
Olfactory receptors